USAS or Usas may refer to:
 Uṣas or Ushas, a Hindu goddess
 Uşas, a platform game for the MSX 2
 USAS (Outer Limits), a space organization in a series of Outer Limits episodes
 USAS (application), a set of applications used by the airline, transportation, and hospitality industries
 United States Air Service, a precursor to the United States Air Force
 United States Antarctic Service
 United Students Against Sweatshops, a United States student organization for worker rights
 USAS-12, an automatic shotgun